Ebrahim Sara (also Romanized as Ebrāhīm Sarā; also known as Ebrāhīmābād, Ibragimsara, and Ibrahimsara) is a village in Luleman Rural District, Kuchesfahan District, Rasht County, Gilan Province, Iran. At the 2006 census, its population was 1,121, in 322 families.

References 

Populated places in Rasht County